Verso de arte mayor (Spanish for 'verse of higher art', or in short 'arte mayor') refers to a multiform verse that appeared in Spanish poetry from the 14th century and has 9 or more syllables.  The term 'verso de arte mayor' is also used for the 'pie de arte mayor', which is a verse composed of two hemistiches, each of which has a rhythmic accent at the beginning and the end, separated by two unstressed syllables.

Originally, it was - in contrast to the shorter 'verso de arte menor' (Spanish for 'verse of lower art') – a long verse of eight to 16 syllables, which later developed into a regular 12-syllable verse with four stressed syllables and a medial caesura.

The verso de arte mayor came to maturity in the 15th century with Juan de Mena’s didactical-allegorically epic poem “Laberinto de Fortuna” (1444).  The couplets of this poem, the so-called “Octavas de Juan de Mena”, consisted each of eight arte mayor verses. In the 16th century, the verso de arte mayor gave way to the Italianate hendecasyllable.

Literature
 Julio Saavedra Molina: El verso de arte mayor. Santiago de Chile 1946
 Martin J. Duffell: Modern metrical theory and the verso de arte mayor. London, 1999. 
 Stephen Cushman, Clare Cavanagh, Jahan Ramazani, Paul Rouzer (ed.). "The Princeton Encyclopedia of Poetry and Poetics: Fourth Edition." Princeton, 2012.

References

14th century in Spain
Spanish poetry